The Committee on Gender, Family, Youths and People with Disabilities is one of the ten permanent committees of the Pan-African Parliament. It concentrates on issues concerning women, family and people and children with disabilities.

Functions of the Committee:
 Consider issues relating to the promotion of gender equality.
 Assist Parliament to oversee the development of policies and activities of the Union relating to family, youth and people with disabilities.

References 

Gender